The Jazz Compositions of Dee Barton is an album by bandleader Stan Kenton recorded in 1967 by Capitol Records.

Reception
The Allmusic review by Scott Yanow says " This LP consists of seven Dee Barton charts of his originals. Barton was the band's drummer and, along with tenor-saxophonist Kim Richmond (who would later develop into a top arranger himself), is about the graduate of this particular group to have a significant jazz career. The music is well-played but not overly memorable, sort of like this edition of the Stan Kenton Orchestra".

Legacy

The album has become the most important artistic achievement by the Kenton organization from that late 1960s era of otherwise desperate attempts at achieving commercial success. The album was different and was not cast in the typical Kenton style most of his fans were familiar with.  When the album is heard with broader ears there are "intriguing colors and attractive themes interacting with typical Kentonian sounds and dissonance."  Trombonist Jim Amlotte sums up this album well, "This is what Stan wanted. He didn't want a copy-cat of what had gone before. Stan didn't like to look back - he was always moving forward to the next thing."

Track listing
All compositions by Dee Barton.
 "Man" - 4:27
 "Lonely Boy" - 2:48
 "The Singing Oyster" - 3:34
 "Dilemma" - 5:54
 "Three Thoughts" - 5:30
 "A New Day" - 7:32
 "Woman" - 6:16

Recorded at Capitol Studios in Hollywood, CA on December 19, 1967 (tracks 3, 5 & 7) and December 20, 1967 (tracks 1, 2, 4 & 6).

Personnel
Stan Kenton - piano, conductor
Jay Daversa, Jim Kartchner, Carl Leach, John Madrid, Mike Price - trumpet
Tom Senff, Dick Shearer, Tom Whittaker - trombone
Jim Amlotte - bass trombone
Graham Ellis - tuba
Ray Reed - alto saxophone, flute
Mike Altschul, Kim Richmond - tenor saxophone
Mike Vaccaro - baritone saxophone
Earle Dumler - baritone saxophone, bass saxophone
Don Bagley - bass 
Dee Barton - drums, arranger

References

Stan Kenton albums
1968 albums
Capitol Records albums
Albums conducted by Stan Kenton

Albums recorded at Capitol Studios
Albums produced by Lee Gillette